An American immigrant novel is a genre of American novel which explores the process of assimilation and the relationship of American immigrants toward American identity and ideas. The novels often show and explore generational differences in immigrant families, especially the first and second generations. The extraordinary ethnic diversity of America allows for a type of immigrant novel which differs from other countries. America, often seen as a country of immigrants, opens up a unique canvas for expression and a better understanding of the American immigrant experience through literature. The narrative styles are diverse and can include memoirs, third-person, first-person, and biographies. The past twenty-five years alone have witnessed a major scholarly emphasis on multiculturalism in American studies, and a flood of new immigrant novels, reflecting the shifting demographics of United States immigration patterns.

Generational changes in attitude, identity, experience, and demographics from real statistics are challenged and explored by immigrant novels, such as the change in income level and attitudes toward assimilation.

Themes 
In these novels, the immigrant experience often begins with a feeling of wild, open-ended adventure, as the protagonists make the move to the US and leave their previous homes halfway around the world. Once they arrive in America, however, the immigrant family often finds themselves in an unfamiliar and seemingly unwelcoming and introverted culture. Tensions appear within and without the family and manifest themselves in problems at work, with health, or strained family relationships.

Parents tend to retain their culture from their home country while their children, the second generation, are fully assimilated Americans who understand American culture and become the guides for their parents. Then often in this pattern the third generation, the grandkids of the original immigrants return to a fascination with their heritage and their grandparent's culture. Recent research highlights the complexity of immigrant generations and their increases and declines in socioeconomic integration, and this genre of the novel explores this complex theme. Age at the time of arrival, family relationships, and economic status all interact to create a diverse genre of novel, dealing with types of questions such as when the immigrants behind to consider themselves American, and when parents and children will end up switching roles as the younger caretaker and the older, but the seemingly helpless beneficiary.

The powerful mother is a common pivotal figure in immigrant fiction, just as the sensitive child, torn between this matriarchal authority and a weaker, less adaptive father, often assumes the book's central consciousness. Paule Marshall's  Brown Girl, Brownstones (1959), fits the pattern, with its tense mother-daughter duo, Silla and Selina. Silla is the archetypal strong Barbadian woman who will scrub floors, work day and night, and save every penny to own someday a piece of America, a brownstone house, even if it means crushing her husband's island-returning dreams in the process. Selena, her articulate, precocious daughter, seeks her own individual identity, with or without the approval of the community. Many immigrant novels fit this  Bildungsroman pattern of tracing the moral, psychological, and intellectual development of a youthful main character: The émigré group's inexperience in the new country and the young protagonist's viewpoint often dovetail neatly. Marshall's vivid, earthy prose thrillingly depicts the speech and singular folkways of the Barbadian colony, both its strivers and the idlers, as it re-roots itself in a Brooklyn ghetto.

Literary examples 
 Bread Givers, Anzia Yezierska
 The Namesake, Jhumpa Lahiri
 Monkey Bridge, Lan Cao
 The House on Mango Street, Sandra Cisneros
 The Joy Luck Club, Amy Tan
 The Kite Runner,Khaled Hosseini
 Digging to America, Anne Tyler

References

American literature
Immigration to the United States